DIT or dit may refer to:

People
 Dit name, an alternative family name, e.g., in French Canadian historical traditions
 Dit Clapper (1907–1978), Canadian ice hockey player

Information technology 
Directory information tree
 dit (unit), a contraction for "decimal digit"
 "." or dot, the shorter of the two symbols used in Morse code
Doctor of Information Technology, a degree

Educational institutions 
Dehradun Institute of Technology, in India
Delhi Institute of Technology, in India
Detroit Institute of Technology, in the US
DigiPen Institute of Technology, in the US
Dublin Institute of Technology, in Ireland

Sports 
 DIT FC, Dili, East Timor, a soccer team
 DIT GAA, Dublin, Ireland, a Gaelic football team

Science 
Defining Issues Test DIT-2, of moral reasoning
Dietary induced thermogenesis
Diiodotyrosine, a chemical compound
Dual inheritance theory
Digital ion trap

Other uses 
Department for Infrastructure and Transport, South Australian government department
Department for International Trade, UK
Digital imaging technician, in the film industry
 Dit, a French narrative poetic form of the Middle Ages (see Medieval French literature)
Diyari language (ISO 639 code: dit)

See also